In the mathematical theory of linear algebraic groups, a Tits index (or index) is an object used to classify semisimple algebraic groups defined over a base field k, not assumed to be algebraically closed. The possible irreducible indices were classified by Jacques Tits, and this classification is reproduced below. (Because every index is a direct sum of irreducible indices, classifying all indices amounts to classifying irreducible indices.)

Organization of the list
An index can be represented as a Dynkin diagram with certain vertices drawn close to each other (the orbit of the vertices under the *-action of the Galois group of k) and with certain sets of vertices circled (the orbits of the non-distinguished vertices under the *-action). This representation captures the full information of the index except when the underlying Dynkin diagram is D4, in which case one must distinguish between an action by the cyclic group C3 or the permutation group S3.

Alternatively, an index can be represented using the name of the underlying Dykin diagram together with additional superscripts and subscripts, to be explained momentarily. This representation, together with the labeled Dynkin diagram described in the previous paragraph,  captures the full information of the index.

The notation for an index is of the form gX, where
 X is the letter of the underlying Dynkin diagram (A, B, C, D, E, F, or G),
 n is the number of vertices of the Dynkin diagram,
 r is the relative rank of the corresponding algebraic group,
 g is the order of the quotient of the absolute Galois group that acts faithfully on the Dynkin diagram (so g = 1, 2, 3, or 6), and
 t is either
 the degree of a certain division algebra (that is, the square root of its dimension) arising in the construction of the algebraic group when the group is of classical type (A, B, C, or D), in which case t is written in parentheses, or
 the dimension of the anisotropic kernel of the algebraic group when the group is of exceptional type (E, F, or G), in which case t is written without parentheses.

An

1An
Image: 

Full name: 1A

Conditions: d · (r + 1) = n + 1, d ≥ 1.

Algebraic group: The special linear group SLr+1(D) where D is a  central division algebra over k.

Special fields: Over a finite field, d = 1; over the reals, d = 1 or 2; over a p-adic field or a number field, d is arbitrary.

2An
Image: 

Full name: 2A

Conditions: d | n + 1, d ≥ 1, 2rd ≤ n + 1.

Algebraic group: The special unitary group SU(n+1)/d(D,h), where D is a central division algebra of degree d over a separable quadratic extension k'  of k, and where h is a nondegenerate hermitian form of index r relative to the unique non-trivial k-automorphism of k' .

Special fields: Over a finite field, d = 1 and r = ⌊(n+1)/2⌋; over the reals, d = 1; over a p-adic field, d = 1 and n = 2r − 1; over a number field, d and r are arbitrary.

Bn
Image: 

Full name: Bn,r

Conditions: None.

Algebraic group: The special orthogonal group SO2n+1(k,q), where q is a quadratic form of index r, and defect 1 if k has characteristic 2.

Special fields:  Over a finite field, r = n; over a p-adic field, r = n or n − 1; over the reals or a number field, r is arbitrary.

Cn
Image: 

Full name: C

Conditions: 2n | 2n, d ≥ 1; n = r if d = 1.

Algebraic group: The special unitary group SU2n/d(D,h), where D is a division algebra of degree d over k and h is a nondegenerate antihermitian form relative to a k-linear involution σ of D (also called an "involution of the first kind") such that the fixed-point subring Dσ has dimension 1/2 d(d + 1); or equivalently, when d > 1 and char k ≠ 2, the group SU2n/d where D and h are as above except that h is hermitian and D has dimension 1/2 d(d − 1). When d = 1, this group is the symplectic group Sp2n(k).

Special fields: Over a finite field, d = 1; over the reals or a number field, d = 1 (and r = n) or d = 2; over a p-adic field, d = 1 (and r = n) or d = 2, and n = 2r or 2r − 1.

Dn

1Dn
Image: 

Full name: 1D

Conditions: d is a power of 2, d | 2n, d ≥ 1, rd ≤ n, n ≠ rd + 1.

Algebraic group: If k has characteristic 2, the same as for Cn except that h is a hermitian form of discriminant 1 and index r.

Special fields: Over a finite field, d = 1 and n = r; over the reals, d = 1 and n − r = 2m, or d = 2 and n = 2r; over a p-adic field, d = 1 and r = n or n − 2, or d = 2 and n = 2r or 2r + 3; over a number field, d = 1 and n − r = 2m, or d = 2 and n − 2r = 2m or 3.

2Dn
Full name: 2D

Image:

3D

Image:

6D

Image:

3D

Image:

6D

Image:

3D

Image:

6D

Image:

E6

1E

Image:

1E

Image:

1E

Image:

1E

Image:

2E

Image:

2E

Image:

2E

Image:

2E

Image:

2E

Image:

2E

Image:

E7

E

Image:

E

Image:

E

Image:

E

Image:

E

Image:

E

Image:

E

Image:

E

Image:

E8

E

Image:

E

Image:

E

Image:

E

Image:

E

Image:

E

Image:

E

Image:

F4

F

Image: 

Algebraic Group: The automorphism group of an exceptional simple Jordan algebra J that does not contain nonzero nilpotent elements.

F

Image: 

Algebraic Group: The automorphism group of an exceptional simple Jordan algebra J containing nonzero nilpotent elements, no two of which are nonproportional and orthogonal.

F

Image: 

Algebraic Group: The automorphism group of an exceptional simple Jordan algebra J containing nonproportional orthogonal nilpotent elements.

G2

A group of type G2 is always the automorphism group of an octonion algebra.

G

Image: 

Algebraic group: the automorphism group of a division octonion algebra.

Special fields: Exists over the reals and number fields; does not exist over finite fields or a p-adic field.

G

Image: 

Algebraic group: the automorphism group of a split octonion algebra.

Special fields: Exists over a finite field, the reals, a p-adic field, and a number field.

Notes

References

Algebraic groups
irreducible Tits indices